Charles Henry Collingwood (born 30 May 1943) is a Canadian-born British actor.

Biography 
Born in Saint John, New Brunswick, Canada, and educated at Sherborne School in Dorset, England, he trained at RADA. He is best known for playing the role of Brian Aldridge in the long-running BBC Radio 4 soap opera The Archers since March 1975. He is married to Judy Bennett who played Shula Hebden Lloyd in the series from 1971-2022.

Collingwood credits the television producer and director Dorothea Brooking as giving him his break in the medium. Brooking specialised in children's programmes, mainly for the BBC, and cast Collingwood in The Raven and the Cross (1974) and  The Secret Garden (1975). He may be better known to television audiences for his appearances in the mid-1990s as the score-keeper on Noel Edmonds' BBC One quiz show Telly Addicts.  He has also had many guest roles in programmes such as Midsomer Murders.  He co-hosted the Southern Television quiz show Under Manning with comedian Bernard Manning, which ran for one series in 1981. He has contributed to the schools' television programme Look and Read (as the voice of 'Wordy') and appears occasionally on BBC Radio 4's Just a Minute. He can also be heard on the audio guide for the Edward Elgar birthplace museum.

For four years he was a newsreader on BBC World Service

He was the subject of This Is Your Life in 2003 when he was surprised by Michael Aspel while recording an episode of The Archers.

He claimed to be related to Admiral Cuthbert Collingwood, second in command to Nelson at Trafalgar (in an appearance on Just a Minute, 24 July 2006).

Selected filmography
 Home Before Midnight (1979)
 The Dark Crystal (1982, voice role)
 Charles and Diana: Unhappily Ever After (1992) as Martin
 Vigo: Passion for Life (1998)

References

External links
 
 Look and Read - Wordy
 Radio 4 biography 
 

1943 births
Living people
Alumni of RADA
British male radio actors
British male soap opera actors
People educated at Sherborne School
People from Saint John, New Brunswick
The Archers